Birangana Sati Sadhani Rajyik Vishwavidyalaya is a public state university located in Golaghat district, Assam. The university is established by The Birangana Sati Sadhani Rajyik Vishwavidyalaya Act, 2020 which was passed by the Government of Assam on 2 September 2020. On 21 February 2021 Government of Assam appointed  Prof. Dr. Jyoti Prasad Saikia as the first Vice-Chancellor of Birangana Sati Sadhani Rajyik Vishwavidyalaya for a term of two years. The university established to commemorate the last queen of the Chutia dynasty, Sati Sadhani.

References 

Universities in Assam
2021 establishments in Assam
Educational institutions established in 2021
State universities in India